The Philippine Charity Sweepstakes Office (PCSO)  is a government-owned and controlled corporation of the Philippines under direct supervision of the Office of the President of the Philippines. It is mandated to do fund raising and provide funds for health programs, medical assistance and services, and charities of national character. The raised collections goes to the President's Presidential Social Fund to improve the country's social welfare.

Sources of Revenue
 Sweepstakes Draw
 National Lotteries (Lotto)
 Small Town Lotteries (to compete with jueteng, an illegal gambling practice)
 Scratchcard (Scratch-it)
 Horse Racing

Allocation of Net Receipts
 Fifty-five percent shall be set aside as a prize fund for the payment of prizes, including those for the owners, jockeys of running horses, and sellers of winning tickets. Prizes not claimed within one year from date of draw shall be considered forfeited, and shall form part of the charity fund for disposition.
 Thirty percent shall be set aside as contributions to the charity/ social fund of the Office of the President.
 Fifteen percent shall be set aside as contributions to the operating expenses and capital expenditures of the PCSO.
 All balances of any funds in the Philippine Charity Sweepstakes Office shall revert to and form part of the charity fund.

The disbursements of these allocations are subject to state auditing rules and regulations.

History
Lotteries were introduced in the Philippines in 1833, as the company called Real Renta de Loteria was founded on January 29, 1850, and the first draw was held on January 21, 1851, under the auspices of private enterprises called the Empresa de Reales Loterias Españolas de Filipinas, the Spanish government conducted loterias to generate revenues. José Rizal won ₱6,200.00 in the draw of 1892, while on exile in Dapitan. He donated his winnings to an educational project.

The loteria was forced to stop operations during the outbreak of the Spanish–American War on July 19, 1898.

In 1932, the first Sweepstakes draw after the last loteria was conducted by the American Insular government to raise funds to support sports projects for the Filipino youth through the Philippine Amateur Athletic Federation (PAAF) – the beneficiary of the first draw. After the success of the PAAF Sweepstakes, the government decided to conduct more draws for the benefit of the Philippine Anti-Tuberculosis Society, now the Philippine Tuberculosis Society (PTS). The draws were held under the auspices of an organization called the National Charity Sweepstakes  (NCS).

In March 1935, then President Manuel L. Quezon approved Act No. 301 – the law passed by the Philippine Legislature on October 30, 1934, creating the Philippine Charity Sweepstakes Office (PCSO), replacing the then National Charity Sweepstakes. Under this law, the new organization was authorized to secure from the National Treasury a loan amounting to ₱250,000.00, the minimum amount required for organizing the office and printing the tickets for the draw. On September 8, 1935, the new agency held its first Sweepstakes draw. The loan was paid back in less than two months and shortly after the note was signed, proceeds from the sales started coming in.

Among its beneficiaries then were the Philippine Amateur Athletic Federation (PAAF; today the Philippine Olympic Committee), the Philippine Tuberculosis Society (PTS), the National Federation of Women's Clubs, the Asociación de Damas de Filipinas, the Gota de Leche, the Associate of Manila and the Provinces, the Philippine Islands Council of the Boy Scouts of America, the Asilo para Invalidos de los Veteranos de la Revolución, the Child Welfare Center and other institutions and organizations engaged in charitable and health work, or work for the improvement of the conditions of the indigent Filipino masses.

Its corporate charter was enacted into law under Republic Act No. 1169 on June 18, 1954, by Ramon Magsaysay. It repealed Act No. 430, as amended by Commonwealth Act Nos. 301 and 546 and by Republic Acts Nos. 72 and 574. In September 1979, Batas Pambansa Blg. 42 was enacted to raise the fund allocation for the agency's Charity Fund and for the use of unclaimed prizes.

In 1987, the PCSO launched the small-town lottery (STL) and Instant Sweepstakes, the STL is intended to compete with jueteng, a popular but illegal numbers game that is criticized as a major source of corruption in local government units and was suspended in 1990.

In January 1995, during the incumbency of then Chairman Manuel Morato, the PCSO launched the very first online lottery in the Philippines known as Lotto, its first draw was held on March 8, 1995. Similar to lotteries in the United States, Europe and Australia, the automated gaming, initially the Lotto 6/42 and later expanded to Mega Lotto 6/45, 6-Digit Lotto and 4-Digit Lotto  in 1997, Super Lotto 6/49 in 2000, Swertres 3D Lotto in 2002, EZ2 Lotto in 2004, Grand Lotto 6/55 in 2010 and Ultra Lotto 6/58 in 2015, the player chooses any set of 6 numbers from 1 to 42 and wins when these numbers are drawn in any sequence during the draw date. An equipment lease was signed with Malaysia's Berjaya Sports Toto Berhad.

On March 20, 2006, through the advise of then President Gloria Macapagal Arroyo, the PCSO revived the small-town lottery (STL).

On July 26, 2019, in a speech, President Rodrigo Duterte declared PCSO games as "illegal" due to corruption allegiations and  closing down the lotto outlets across the country by the Philippine National Police (PNP), temporarily suspending its gaming operations after the speech, Lotto operations was resumed on July 31, 2019, and small-town-lottery operations on August 22, 2019.

From July 26 to August 26, 2019, President Rodrigo Duterte has suspended the STL operations around the country due to allegations of corruption.

On March 17, 2020, PCSO's gaming-related operations such as Lotto, Keno, digit games and small-town lottery in Luzon is temporarily suspended for the second time following the enhanced community quarantine in Luzon amid COVID-19 pandemic.

On April 7, 2020, PCSO announced that small-town lottery in Visayas and Mindanao is temporarily suspended for the second time due to the COVID-19 pandemic.

On April 16, 2020, Davao City Mayor Sara Duterte banned small-town lottery in Davao City for the second time, also due to the COVID-19 pandemic.

References

External links
 Official website
 Philippine Racing Club (Santa Ana Park)
 Manila Jockey Club (Santa Lazaro)
Daily Lotto results website

1934 establishments in the Philippines
Lotteries
Government-owned and controlled corporations of the Philippines
Government agencies under the Office of the President of the Philippines
Government agencies established in 1934
Charities based in the Philippines